Rex Richardson (born August 18, 1983) is an American politician from California who has served as the mayor of Long Beach, California since 2022. A member of the Democratic Party, Richardson was previously served as a member of the Long Beach City Council, representing the 9th District From 2014 until 2022.

Early life and career
Richardson was born on August 18, 1983, at Scott Air Force Base in Illinois. His father was a member of the United States Air Force and his mother worked for General Motors as a welder on their assembly line. His parents divorced when he was three or four years old, and he and his siblings relocated with their mother, living in Michigan, Minnesota, and Missouri before settling in Pickens County, Alabama, before moving to California when he was 11 years old. He graduated from Covina High School and enrolled at California State University, Dominguez Hills. He served as student body president, but dropped out of college without graduating to take a job as a community organizer for the Service Employees International Union Local 721.

In 2010, Steve Neal, the member of the Long Beach City Council for the ninth district, hired Richardson as his chief of staff and tasked him with organizing community groups in the district. In 2014, Neal ran for the California Assembly, and Richardson was elected to the city council to succeed him. In 2015, he rolled out the My Brother's Keeper Challenge to Long Beach. He was elected vice mayor of Long Beach in 2016. Richardson returned to college through remote learning in 2020, and completed his bachelor's degree from Cal State Dominguez Hills.

Mayor of Long Beach

Election 

Richardson announced his candidacy for the mayoralty of Long Beach in January 2022, upon Robert Garcia's retirement to run for the United States House of Representatives. He received the endorsements of Senator Alex Padilla, Governor Gavin Newsom, and the outgoing Mayor Garcia.

In the June 7 primary election, Richardson and fellow councilor Suzie Price received the most votes, but since no candidate received a majority of the votes, the election advanced to a runoff. Richardson would win the runoff election on November 8, 2022, becoming the first Black mayor of Long Beach.

Tenure 
Richardson was sworn in on December 20, 2022.

Personal life
Richardson and his wife, Nina, have two daughters. They live in North Long Beach.

Electoral history

References

External links

1983 births
21st-century African-American politicians
21st-century American politicians
African-American city council members in California
African-American mayors in California
California Democrats
California State University, Dominguez Hills alumni
Living people
Mayors of Long Beach, California
People from Long Beach, California